Baeonoma euphanes is a moth of the family Depressariidae. It is found in French Guiana.

The wingspan is 9–10 mm. The forewings are dark fuscous with a short white mark on the base of the dorsum and a triangular white blotch on the dorsum beyond the middle, reaching half across the wing. The apex is narrowly white. The hindwings are rather dark grey, thinly scaled in the disc.

References

Moths described in 1916
Baeonoma
Moths of South America
Taxa named by Edward Meyrick